Keith John Garagozzo (born October 25, 1969) is a former American Major League Baseball pitcher, who appeared in 7 games for the Minnesota Twins in 1994.

Garagozzo was drafted by the New York Yankees in the 9th round of the 1991 Amateur draft out of  the University of Delaware.

References

External links

1969 births
Living people
All-American college baseball players
Baseball players from Camden, New Jersey
Columbus Clippers players
Delaware Fightin' Blue Hens baseball players
Greensboro Hornets players
Major League Baseball pitchers
Minnesota Twins players
Albany-Colonie Yankees players
Brevard County Manatees players
Oneonta Yankees players
Prince William Cannons players
Holy Cross Academy (New Jersey) alumni